Wayne Rhoden  is a music producer, singer, songwriter, sound engineer and video editor/director who is professionally known as the artist Father Goose Music, is the winner of the 18th Annual Independent Music Awards and the Grammy Awards with the group “Dan Zanes and Friends” also  Nominated for the 64th Grammy Awards for Best Children's Album with the group 1 Tribe Collective and he is also known as Rankin Don and Don Chibaka. Seen on the Disney Channel, he also peaked at # 7 on the Billboard Reggae Chart.

Biography 
Wayne Rhoden (Music), known professionally as Father Goose, is a Jamaican-born producer, singer, songwriter.

He made a name for himself in the underground circuit in Jamaica and on the streets of Brooklyn, New York under the personas of Rankin Don
and Don Chibaka.
As Father Goose
he performs children's music, Kindie rock, and reggae-fied nursery rhymes, often in the “Dan Zanes and Friends” ensemble, including in a series of Disney videos entitled “House Party Time.”

Early life 
Wayne Rhoden was born in Jamaica to Joyce and James Rhoden and grew up in Brooklyn, New York. Like many musical artists, his debut performance occurred at a young age. He recalls that his first singing performance happened at the age of five, using his family and friends as his audience. On subsequent occasions he would serve as DJ for parties thrown by his parents.
Later he performed in a PTA-hosted Ash Wednesday fundraising fair at his Ewarton grade school.

He attended Erasmus High School in Brooklyn, New York, then went on to pursue a career in electrical engineering. But as fate would have it, he was drawn to his first love, music.

Musical career 
In the 1980s as Rankin Don he recorded the hits
Can’t Find Me Love and Baddest DJ
and in the 90s the Real McCoy, Black Queen, and Green Card. He was later introduced to producers who urged him to 
record for the mainstream labels. He has performed at concerts
with some of reggae's well-known artists including, Gregory Isaacs, Andre, Sleepy Worder, Lloyd D Stiff, and Blacka Ranks;
Grammy nominees Beres Hammond and Freddie McGregor; and past 
Grammy winners Shabba Ranks, Shaggy, and Beenie Man.

His relationship with musician Dan Zanes was initiated by his mother, who while working for Zanes, suggested that he should meet her son and check out his talent.

In the 2000s as Father Goose he was featured on several Dan Zanes albums such as Rocket Ship Beach and Catch That Train! and also released three of his own albums: Color with Father Goose, It’s a Bam Bam Diddly, and Bashment Time.

In 2008 as Don Chibaka he gave his performance on the Etcetera single Dance Like That (Remix) featuring Richie Stephens and Kevin Lyttle.

Personal life 

Rhoden is the father of two. He lives in Brooklyn with his wife and his son (Little Goose) who also sings and performs in his father's band.

In 2007, Rhoden discovered he had kidney failure. He received a kidney in December 2015 after eight years on dialysis, twice on life support and other complications. The kidney transplant was successful: he has made a full recovery and is currently still performing and hosting music workshops for children.

Discography

Rankin Don 
 1989 One In A Million feat: Jerry Chapter
 1990 Can't Find Mi Love feat: King Ledgi
 1990 Whip Appeal feat: King Ledgi
 1992 Baddest DJ
 1994 Black Queen feat: Singing Singing
 1996 Real McCoy 
 1996 The Big Race feat: Shelene Thomas, Round Head, Screechy Dan, General B, Baja Jedd 
 1997 Green Card feat: Mad Tempa
 2004 More To Me feat: 'Coolie Ranx'
 2004 You Are My Girl
 2004 Big O feat: King Ledgi
 2004 She She Remix feat: Little Lenny, Ricky 10
 2004 Push Up On Me feat: Snypah
 2004 Chance Remix feat: Fyona Sanderson
 2004 It ain't over feat: Mad Lion
 2004 Give me one more chance feat: Wayne Smith, King Ledgi
 2013 You're My Girl
 2013 You Mate
 2013 Marlena
 2013 Praise to Jah
 2014 God & Me

Don Chibaka 
 2008 Dance Like That (Remix) feat: Etcetera, Richie Stephens, Kevin Lyttle

Father Goose Music 
 2000 Rocket Ship Beach 
 2001 Family Dance 
 2002 Night Time! 
 2003 House Party (Grammy nominated, for Best Children's Album) 
 2003 Color with Father Goose 
 2005 All Around the Kitchen! 
 2006 Catch That Train! (Grammy Award Winning Album) 
 2007 It's a Bam Bam Diddly (Peaked #7 for 2 weeks on the Billboard Charts, Parents' Choice Award Winning Album and also nominated for 
The 8th Independent Music Award for Best Children's Album & also on the Grammy Ballot, for Best Children's Album)
 2008 The Welcome Table 
 2009 76 Trombones 
 2011 Little Nut Tree 
 2013 Swing Low "Bear Hunt!"
 2013 I love U  "Bear Hunt!"
 2014 Get Loose and Get Together!: The Best of Dan Zanes 
 2014 Bashment Time
 2015 I Love u (JZ Remix) "Rocksteady"
 2016 Dance to the Reggae Rhythm, Aaron Nigel Smith album "One"
 2016 Father Goose 7
 2016 Irie Christmas feat. Dan Zanes, Sonia De Los Santos, Kate Ferber & Danger D.
 2017 Father Goose Music "Friday" feat. Little Goose, Elena Moon Park, Yami Bolo, Itimo
 2017 Father Goose Music "Friday Da Remix"
 2017 Father Goose Music "In The Mirror"
 2017 Father Goose Music "I Wanna Love U" Featuring Josh and the Jamtones, Aaron Nigel Smith, Little Goose, Itimo
 2017 Dan Zanes Lead Belly Baby "Polly Wee" also feat. Little Goose (Independent Music Award winner for Best Children's Album)
 2018 Father Goose Music "I Have A Dream" feat. Itimo
 2018 Free Bubbles by Mista Cookie Jar
 2018 King Of The Dance Party (61st Annual GRAMMY® Awards Ballot also nominated for The 17th Independent Music Award) 
 2018 Rising Star (feat. Mikayla & Itimo)
 2019 La Bamba
 2019 I Can Make it (EP)
 2019 Rise Up Now (62st Annual GRAMMY® Awards Ballot)
 2019 I'm A Gamer by Irie Goose
 2020 Life 
 2020 Dance With You 
 2020 Allo Allo Allo 
 2020 Come Again 
 2020 Lemonade & Sunshine 
 2020 Make It 
 2020 Stop da Bullying Irie Goose feat. Father Goose Music 
 2020 Da Gamer Irie Goose feat. Father Goose Music 
 2020 Lemonade
 2021 Live Your Life feat. Etcetera, iRiE GoOsE, Lucy Kalantari, Danni Ai and David Allan Rivera.
 2021 Voice of a Child
 2021 Invisible (Acoustic)
 2021 May the Force Be with You (Intro)
 2021 Oh God!!! (Feat. Drsya)
 2021 Turn It Up (Intro) 
 2021 Nice Meeting You Too
 2021 The Whisper (Intro) 
 2021 I Testify (Feat. Drsya)
 2021 I Am (Intro)
 2021 Black Brown White
 2021 Why (Feat. Drsya, iRiE GooSe and Etcetera)
 2021 Father GooSe Music (Intro)
 2021 Invisible (Bonus Track)
 2021 One Tribe - 1 Tribe Collective (Nominated for 64th Grammy Awards for Best Children's Album)
 2022 Make Some Change (Aaron Nigel Smith, Red Yarn feat. Father Goose Music)
 2022 A Ticket To Ride (Donikkl feat. Father Goose Music & Irie Goose) (Winner of the Funky Kids Radio Awards)
 2022 What If (Feat. Drsya and iRiE GooSe)
 2023 The Leader in You (Esther Crow feat. Father Goose Music)
 2023 Calling Me
 2023 Calling Me (Acoustic)

Awards and nominations
 2004 Parents' Choice Award Audio: Music What Is It? Musical Math & Science
 2006 49th Annual Grammy Awards (with Dan Zanes and Friends), Best Musical Album for Children, Catch That Train!
 2008 Parents' Choice Award Audio: Music It’s A Bam Bam Diddly
 2008 Independent Music Awards Nominee for Best Children's Album, It’s A Bam Bam Diddly
 2019 Independent Music Awards Nominee for Best Children's Song, Nice To Meet U from the album King Of The Dance Party
 2023 The Funky Kids Radio Global Awards Audio: Music A Ticket To Ride

References

External links 
 
 
 
 
 

Living people
1966 births
American children's musicians
Private Music artists
Musicians from Brooklyn
Singers from New York City
Jamaican singer-songwriters
American male singers
Independent Music Awards winners
Jamaican reggae musicians
Jamaican ska musicians
American folk musicians
Jamaican male singers
Grammy Award winners